Paul Okoye (born 18 November 1981), who is better known as Rudeboy, is a Nigerian singer. He rose to fame in the 2000s as a member of the P-Square duo with his identical twin brother Peter Okoye.

Early life and education 
Paul studied at St. Murumba secondary school in Jos, together with his brother, Peter also known as Mr P. Paul joined a school of music and drama club where he started dancing and performing covers songs produced by MC Hammer, Bobby Brown and Michael Jackson with his brother Peter.

Solo career 
After the disbandment of P-Square in 2017, both band members sought separate musical careers. Rudeboy released his debut solo tracks titled 'Fire Fire' and 'Nkenji Keke' in 2017. His song "Reason With Me" generated the highest views on YouTube in Africa in 2019. He is the founder of Fire Department Inc, a record label he established in 2019.
He released his debut studio album Rudykillus in 2021.

Personal life 
On 22 March 2014 Okoye married Anita Isama, whom he met in 2004 during his studies at the University of Abuja. In 2013, their son Andre was born in Atlanta, Georgia, United States. The couple also have a set of twins who were delivered in Atlanta, USA.

In August 2021, his wife filed for divorce due to irreconcilable differences with him.

References 

1981 births
Living people
Nigerian singer-songwriters
Twin musicians